James A. Congalton (September 26, 1879 – October 10, 1947) was a Canadian curler. He was a member of the 1930 (third) and 1932 (skip) Brier Champion teams, representing Manitoba. He was a 1975 inductee to the Canadian Curling Hall of Fame. He died suddenly in 1947.

References

Brier champions
1879 births
1947 deaths
Curlers from Winnipeg
Sportspeople from Guelph
Canadian male curlers